Poul Rasmussen (21 October 1896 – 21 June 1966) was a Danish fencer. He competed in four events at the 1920 Summer Olympics.

References

1896 births
1966 deaths
Danish male fencers
Olympic fencers of Denmark
Fencers at the 1920 Summer Olympics
Sportspeople from Copenhagen